Ilgaz Mountains is a mountain range in northwest Anatolia, Turkey. It belongs to the Pontic Mountains system.

Geography 
In west Black Sea region, there are three ranges of mountains, which run parallel to the Black Sea coast. The northern slopes of the mountains are in Kastamonu Province and the southern slopes are in Çankırı Province.

History
The ancient Greeks and Romans generally knew the mountains as Olgassys. It was considered a lofty and inaccessible mountain on the frontiers of ancient Paphlagonia and Galatia, extending from the Halys River (Kızılırmak) in a southwestern direction towards the Sangarius, and containing the sources of the Parthenius River. The surrounding country was filled with temples erected by the Paphlagonians. The mountain mentioned by Ptolemy under the name of Ligas, Gigas, or Oligas, is probably the same as the Olgassys of Strabo. William Smith considered the current name a corruption of the former name.

National park 

The Mount Ilgaz National Park at the west of the highway pass was opened on June 2, 1976 and is easily accessible from the highway . At the highest elevation of the park, there are a number of hotels servicing to skiers. During the summertime, the visitors may fish in the Baldıran Valley within the national park.

Ecology
Ilgaz Mountains, especially the northern slopes, are covered with dense forestry. The popular name of the forestry around Ilgaz Mountains is "sea of trees". Some of the wild animals living in the wooded ranges are red deer, roe deer, fallow deer, wild boar, brown bear, gray wolf, European jackal, chamois and red fox. In 1996, a new insect species was discovered in Ilgaz Mountain ecology and in 2010 it was named as Merodon Ilgazense.

In popular music 
The theme of a popular song "Ilgaz" composed by Ahmet Samim Bilgen and lyrics by Cemil Türkarman is about Ilgaz Mountains.

References

External links

Landforms of Kastamonu Province
Landforms of Çankırı Province
National parks of Turkey
Ski areas and resorts in Turkey
Protected areas established in 1976
Mountain ranges of Turkey
Tourist attractions in Çankırı Province
Tourist attractions in Kastamonu Province
Important Bird Areas of Turkey